Sheikh Ahmad bin Ali bin Abdullah bin Jassim bin Mohammed Al Thani (1922 – 25 November 1977) was the Emir of Qatar who ruled from 1960 to 1972. Qatar's financial status witnessed significant improvements during his reign as a result of the enrichment and discovery of several new oil fields. Qatar also gained its independence as a sovereign state in September 1971 under his rule. He was deposed in February 1972 by his cousin, Khalifa bin Hamad Al Thani.

Biography

Early life and deposition
Sheikh Ahmad was born in Doha, the capital city and state of Qatar, in 1922 as the 2nd son of Sheikh Ali bin Abdullah Al Thani, along with his 12 siblings, to be exact, he had 9 brothers and 3 sisters, although some sources prove that he had 10 brothers instead of 9.

He  took the throne on 24 October 1960 after his father, Sheikh Ali bin Abdullah Al Thani, abdicated in his favor. Sheikh Ahmad then assumed throne and became the emir through the final years of dependency, overseeing the nation's independence from Great Britain in 1971. Sheikh Ahmad attended numerous royal coronations, including the Coronation of Queen Elizabeth II at Westminster Abbey in 1953. On the same day his reign began, his cousin Sheikh Khalifa bin Hamad Al Thani was appointed as the heir apparent and deputy ruler. On 22 February 1972, Sheikh Khalifa deposed him in a bloodless coup d'état. During the incident, Sheikh Ahmad was in Iran on a hunting trip. After his deposition, Sheikh Ahmad lived in self imposed exile in Dubai with his wife, the daughter of the late Ruler of Dubai and children, in that emirate.

Reign

1963 Arab Nationalism movements
In April 1963, a nationalist labor group known as the National Unity Front was formed in response to a relative of Sheikh Ahmad opening fire on a nationalist demonstration and killing a protester. The demonstration had been organized by North Yemeni migrant workers who supported their government's union with the United Arab Republic. The group's formation was precipitated by public dissent with the ruling family's extravagant lifestyles and Sheikh Ahmed's long absences abroad since he ascended to the throne in 1960. Co-founded by a wealthy businessman and a tribal leader, the group soon gained popularity among Arab nationalists, individuals sympathetic to the Ba'ath Party and Qatari laborers.

They staged a mini-uprising in the central Doha market that year in response to the shooting where they presented their demands to the government.  Some of these demands would have curtailed Sheikh Ahmad's power. The government rejected all these demands, and amid a tense atmosphere, many of the National Unity Front members were arrested and detained without trial. However, Sheikh Ahmad did institute some reforms, such as the provision of land and loans to poor farmers.

Achievements

Economic achievements
Sheikh Ahmad's rule witnessed the growing economic activities in the country as the result of the discovery of a large number of oil fields in Qatar. At that time, and in January 1964, full-scale production commenced in the Idd al-Shargi field, the first seabed field in the world to be operated entirely as an offshore facility. Moreover, in 1963, the larger field at Maydan Mahzam was discovered and in 1965 an oil terminal was set up on the Island of Halul. Exploration of the Bul Hannien field started in 1965 and production commenced in 1977. With the growth of oil economy, Qatar moved rapidly towards the introduction of modern administrative system. Sheikh Ahmad established the Ministry of Finance in November 1960 and Sheikh Khalifa, the Heir Apparent and Deputy Ruler at that time, was appointed as the first Minister of Finance. After that, Sheikh Ahmed established The Department of General Financial and Administration in order to handle all governmental affairs of a financial and administrative nature. Then, in 1967, the Department of Civil Service was also set up.

Independence of Qatar
Gradually the administration of Qatar began to take final shape and the country moved for independence. Following the British Labour Government's announcement in January 1968, for withdrawal from the east of Suez terminating the treaties of protection with the Gulf rulers and their failure to form a confederation of the nine gulf states, Qatar moved forward for forming a Cabinet. On 2 April 1970, the Provisional Constitution for Qatar was promulgated and the first Council of Ministers of the country was formed on 28 May 1970. The independence of Qatar as a sovereign state terminating the Anglo-Qatari Treaty of 1916 was declared on 3 September 1971.

Marriage and children
Sheikh Ahmad bin Ali Al Thani had married three times. One of his wives was Hassa bint Hamad Al Thani. Another wife was the daughter of Sheikh Rashid bin Said Al Maktum, then Ruler of Dubai. He had nine children, seven sons and two daughters.

Sheikh Abdulaziz bin Ahmad Al Thani (born to Hassa bint Hamad Al Thani)
Sheikh Nasser bin Ahmad Al Thani
Sheikh Hamad bin Ahmad Al Thani
Sheikh Saud bin Ahmad Al Thani
Sheikha Hessa bint Ahmad Al Thani
Sheikh Abdullah bin Ahmad Al Thani
Sheikh Khalid bin Ahmad Al Thani
Sheikha Munira bint Ahmad Al Thani
Sheikh Mansour bin Ahmad Al Thani

Death
Though some reconciliation was achieved with his cousin, Sheikh Ahmad elected to remain in exile and died in London while getting treated for cancer on 25 November 1977 and his body was flown back to Qatar and received by the ruling family and he received a formal funeral which was attended by the Emir and ruling family and buried in Al Rayyan cemetery and a three-day mourning period was announced.

References

External links
The Al Thani Family Tree

20th-century rulers in Asia
1922 births
1977 deaths
Emirs of Qatar
Ahmad bin Ali
Qatari exiles
Muslim monarchs
Qatari expatriates in the United Arab Emirates
Leaders ousted by a coup